Robert Christopher Riley (born October 11, 1980) is an American film, television, and stage actor of Trinidadian and Bajan descent. He is known for his role as Terrence Wall in the VH1 television drama series Hit The Floor from 2013 to 2016, and for playing Michael Culhane in The CW's 2017 Dynasty reboot.

Early life

Riley was born and raised in Brooklyn, New York. His mother is from Trinidad and father is from Barbados. Riley attended Brooklyn Technical High School where he participated in the school's drama club and also played safety for the Engineers. He went to college and received his B.A. in Theater from Lehigh University in Bethlehem, Pennsylvania, in 2003. In 2006, he received his Masters in Theater from Ohio University. He played college football and wrote his first theatrical script which he also directed.

Career
From 2013 to 2016, Riley played Terrence Wall in the VH1 television drama series Hit The Floor.

On Broadway, Riley played the role of Dave Robinson in Lombardi and starred in the 2009 production of Tennessee Williams Cat On A Hot Tin Roof as Brick, succeeding Terrence Howard in the role. In 2014, he appeared as Jay "The Sport" Jackson in the Old Globe Theatre's production of television writer and producer Marco Ramirez's The Royale. He also played Jared in the 2016 TV One movie Bad Dad Rehab.

In March 2017, Riley was cast in The CW's Dynasty reboot as chauffeur Michael Culhane.

Filmography

Film

Television

Video Games

Music Videos

Staff credits

References

External links

1980 births
African-American male actors
American male stage actors
American male film actors
American male television actors
Male actors from New York City
Lehigh University alumni
Living people
People from Brooklyn
21st-century African-American people
20th-century African-American people